Seventh Key is an American rock band formed by Mike Slamer of City Boy and Streets and Billy Greer of Streets and Kansas. They record and perform live during Greer's downtime from Kansas.

The current lineup consists of Greer on bass and lead vocals, Slamer on guitar, bass, keyboards and drums (under the pseudonym "Chet Wynd"), Pat McDonald on drums, David Manion on keyboard, and Terry Brock on guitar and backing vocals. Jamie Thompson (2004) previously played drums, as well as guest appearances by Robby Steinhardt of Kansas on the violin (2005) and Johnny Greer on the mandolin (2005).

Discography

Studio albums 
2001 - Seventh Key
2004 - The Raging Fire
2013 - I Will Survive

Live albums
2005 - Live in Atlanta

References

External links
 

Rock music groups from Florida
Musical groups established in 2001
Frontiers Records artists